General Wise may refer to:

Henry A. Wise (1806–1876), Confederate States Army brigadier general
Mark R. Wise (fl. 1980s–2020s), U.S. Marine Corps lieutenant general

See also
Attorney General Wise (disambiguation)